Future planning of the Royal Navy's capabilities is set through periodic Defence Reviews carried out by the British Government. The Royal Navy's role in the 2020s, and beyond, is outlined in the 2021 defence white paper, which was published on 22 March 2021. The white paper is one component of the Integrated Review of Security, Defence, Development and Foreign Policy, titled as Global Britain in a Competitive Age which was published on 16 March 2021.

The National Audit Office (NAO) has, for a considerable period of time, described the Ministry of Defence's equipment plan as "unaffordable". As late as January 2021 the NAO reported that the Royal Navy had the largest shortfall of the three services at £4.3 billion over the 2020 to 2030 period. To address some of these gaps, in November 2020, the Prime Minister announced the first outcome of the defence review by pledging increased funding in the range of £16.5 billion over four years to stabilise the defence budget and to provide new funding for space, cyber and research activities. A plan to construct a new class of frigate, the Type 32 frigate, was also announced with five vessels envisaged and likely entering service starting in the early 2030s, though many other details about the program remain to be decided, even following publication of the March 2021 defence white paper. The British government plans to increase the Royal Navy's fleet to 24 frigates and destroyers, perhaps achieving that objective by the mid-2030s. 

In March 2023, a further £5 billion in funding was announced as part of a defence policy "refresh" exercise to "help replenish and bolster vital ammunition stocks, modernise the UK’s nuclear enterprise and fund the next phase of the AUKUS submarine programme".  

As of February 2023, the following major vessels are under construction: the final two of seven s; the first three of four Dreadnought-class ballistic missile submarines, the first three of eight Type 26 frigates; and two of the five Type 31 frigates. Additional replenishment vessels were on order for the Royal Fleet Auxiliary, together with the acquisition and conversion of commercial vessels for ocean seabed surveillance and mine countermeasures roles.

Ships under construction

Royal Navy
The following is a list of vessels ordered, under construction or undergoing sea trials within the United Kingdom, and destined for the Royal Navy:

Royal Fleet Auxiliary
The following is a list of vessels ordered, being converted from previous commercial roles or planned for construction in the United Kingdom, destined for the Royal Fleet Auxiliary:

Ships

Destroyers and frigates

In the 2010 Strategic Defence and Security Review (SDSR) a replacement programme was authorised for the Navy's fleet of thirteen Type 23 frigates. In 2012, BAE Systems Naval Ships was awarded a contract to design the replacement, known as the Type 26 Global Combat Ship (GCS). It was planned that two variants of the class would be built: five general purpose frigates and eight anti-submarine warfare frigates. According to estimates as of 2022, the first Type 26 frigate is to commission in late 2026 and the last commissioning in around 2034, whilst the Type 23s are gradually phased out. However, in October 2022, the Secretary of Defence, Ben Wallace, indicated that Initial Operating Capability for the first ship in the class would only be reached in 2028.Eight Type 26 frigates will be built. The five remaining ships will be covered by a new class of lighter, flexible general purpose frigate, known as the Type 31e frigate or General Purpose Frigate (GPFF).

The slower than planned introduction of both the Type 26 and Type 31, coupled with the pending retirement dates for the Type 23, created a risk that Royal Navy frigate numbers would decline in the 2020s to as few as 8 frigates. Reductions were partly confirmed in the 2021 defence white paper with the announcement that two of the Type 23s would, in fact, be retired early. Nevertheless, the at sea availability of ships (both destroyers and frigates) within this smaller force would actually increase as vessels complete their life extension refits. By the latter 2020s and 2030s it is anticipated that overall numbers may rise again as the replacement vessels enter service. In 2021 in a written answer provided to the House of Commons Select Defence Committee, the First Sea Lord, Admiral Tony Radakin, suggested that older Type 23 frigates would be retained in service longer than anticipated in order to ensure that escort numbers did not fall below 17 ships (6 destroyers and 11 frigates) and start to rise back above 19 escorts starting in the latter 2020s.
The objective of the 2021 white paper is to have 24 frigates and destroyers in service by the "early 2030s", though some argued that a date of 2035 was more likely. This is to be achieved through the construction of yet another class of frigate, the Type 32.

In November 2020, the first decisions of the Integrated Review were announced which included a pledge to construct the Type 32 frigate. No further details were included but the announcement was made in the context of restoring the United Kingdom as "the foremost naval power in Europe" and to "spur a shipbuilding renaissance". Later, the 2021 white paper indicated that the Type 32 was to be "designed to protect territorial waters, provide persistent presence overseas and support our Littoral Response Groups". In November 2020, the Ministry of Defence described the ship as a platform for autonomous systems, such as anti-submarine warfare and mine countermeasures. As of late 2022, the Type 32 frigate project was reported to be facing significant funding pressures. The November 2022 report of the National Audit Office on The Equipment Plan 2022-2032 stated that in July 2022 "Navy Command withdrew its plans for Type 32 frigates and MRSS because of concerns about unaffordability. The revised costing profile is likely to be significantly higher".

The March 2021 defence white paper also announced that a new class of air defence destroyer, the Type 83, would be designed to replace the Type 45 destroyer with the aim of achieving initial delivery in the latter 2030s. In the interim, in July 2021 it was announced that the Type-45 destroyers would be upgraded through the addition of 24 cells for the Sea Ceptor surface-to-air missile system. The Type-45s were reported as likely to be incrementally upgraded between 2026 and 2032.

Mine countermeasures and Hydrographic Capability (MHC)

The 2015 SDSR specified that only 12 mine-counter measure vessels were planned to exist in Joint Force 2025. The three oldest Sandown-class minehunters were decommissioned. At one point it was anticipated that the UK and France would collaborate on a Maritime Mine Counter Measures project. At DESI 2017, the First Sea Lord mentioned that the Royal Navy aimed to accelerate the incremental delivery of future mine countermeasures and hydrographic capability (MHC) programme.

All of these plans notwithstanding, in 2020 the parliamentary National Audit Office (NAO) noted that no funding had been allocated in the 2019 to 2029 period to replace the Navy's mine countermeasures capability. The 2021 defence white paper subsequently confirmed that all existing MCMV vessels would be phased out in the 2020s and replaced by autonomous systems.

Preliminary measures were taken to equip the Royal navy with autonomous minehunting systems and in May 2015, a contract was signed with Atlas Elektronik UK to supply Unmanned surface vessels (USVs) of their ARCIMS system for autonomous mine clearance. The first boat delivered under this contract was the optionally-manned RNMB Hazard, which took part in Exercise Unmanned Warrior 16. She was followed by the autonomous RNMB Hussar in 2018 and RNMB Harrier in August 2020, by which time they came under Project Wilton within the First Mine Counter Measures Squadron at HMNB Clyde. RNMB Hebe, due in Spring 2021, will be longer -  instead of  - to accommodate a Portable Operations Centre Afloat that allows her to control Harrier and Hazard while also co-ordinating autonomous operations.

Following on the Prime Minister's announcement in late 2020 of enhanced funding for the Ministry of Defence, Jeremy Quin, Minister of State for Defence Procurement, indicated on 30 November 2020, in response to a parliamentary question, that the envisaged Type 32 frigate would, in part, replace the current mine countermeasures ships and act as a "mothership" for the Navy's future unmanned mine countermeasures capabilities, as well as serving as a platform for anti-submarine warfare. Specifically, he said "... it is envisioned that Type 32 will be a platform for autonomous systems, adding to the Navy's capabilities for missions such as anti-submarine warfare and mine countermeasures". Type 32, as well as other platforms, could potentially carry a new autonomous system, which itself was announced on 26 November 2020 as being acquired through a joint production contract with France. This system employs three sets of equipment with each set comprising a portable operation centre, an autonomous surface vessel, towed sonar and a mine neutralization system.

In December 2022, it was reported that a commercial vessel was being sought for the Royal Fleet Auxiliary which would act as a mothership for autonomous mine hunting systems. The new vessel, named RFA Stirling Castle, is the former offshore support vessel MV Island Crown which, after her entry into service, is likely be based at the Clyde naval base. The ship was purchased for 40 million pounds and arrived at HMNB Devonport in January 2023. Her conversion was not anticipated to be lengthy and it was reported that she would be in service by Spring 2023. In due course two additional ships, and a total of six mission systems, will also be acquired, one of which is intended to replace RFA Cardigan Bay and some of the other vessels in 9th Mine Counter-Measures Squadron operating from HMS Jufair in Bahrain. Cardigan Bay would then be returned to a primary amphibious operations role.

Future amphibious capability
The 2021 defence white paper outlined a proposal related to the composition of the Royal Navy's future amphibious capability. While the white paper was unclear about whether the Royal Navy's Albion-class assault ships would be replaced, it did announce an intent to acquire a new class of up to six "Multi Role Support Ships (MRSS) (almost certaintly as Bay-class landing ship replacements), to provide the platforms to deliver Littoral Strike, including Maritime Special Operations in the 2030s". These vessels superseded an earlier plan, announced by the former Secretary of State for Defence Gavin Williamson in February 2019, that the Royal Navy would purchase two commercial ships and develop them into Littoral Strike Ships.

The new MRSS vessels were envisaged as having the utility to transport and deliver troops, vehicles, equipment and supplies from anywhere in the world in support of amphibious warfare and littoral manoeuvre. They were envisaged as incorporating a "mix of ship-to-shore offloading and logistics capabilities allow support to naval operations through landing craft, boat operations, multi-spot aviation and replenishment at sea". As of late 2022, the Multi-Role Support Ships were reported to be facing significant funding pressures. The November 2022 report of the National Audit Office on The Equipment Plan 2022-2032 stated that in July 2022 "Navy Command withdrew its plans for Type 32 frigates and MRSS because of concerns about unaffordability. The revised costing profile is likely to be significantly higher".

The white paper announced that, in the interim, one of the three Bay-class vessels would be converted to a Littoral Strike Ship (LSS) and fitted with permanent hangars as well as incorporating other upgrades. In May 2022, it was indicated that Lyme Bay was likely to be selected for the role. However, the planned conversion was subsequently delayed, with, in July 2022, reports appearing that the future Littoral Strike Role would now be assumed by RFA Argus. This followed an announcement that Argus would be retained until at least the early 2030s.

Multi Role Ocean Surveillance ship

The 2021 defence white paper announced an intent to acquire a Multi-Role Ocean Surveillance ship (MROSS). The ship is planned to enter service in 2024 and was planned to be "fitted with advanced sensors and will carry a number of remotely operated and autonomous undersea drones which will collect data to help protect our people and way of life with operations in UK and international waters". It was envisaged as necessary to protect undersea cable links to the UK and as a likely replacement for the current ocean survey ship, .

In November 2022, the Ministry of Defence announced that the programme would be accelerated using funds gained through the cancellation of the National Flagship, a vessel which was to be used by the monarch and government officials to promote UK interests abroad. The MOD also confirmed that the first MROSS vessel would enter service with the Royal Fleet Auxiliary in January 2023. In January 2023, the first vessel for this role - MV Topaz Tangaroa - was acquired and is to enter service as RFA Proteus. She was purchsed for some 70 million pounds and is to be converted to act as a mothership for autonomous systems and with military communications and light defensive armament to be added. A second MROS ship is envisaged, which is to be a new build vessel and, as of 2023, is in the concept stage.

Unmanned Surface Vessels

Maritime Autonomy Surface Testbed (MAST) 13 is a collaboration between DSTL and L3Harris Technologies. In September 2019, Secretary of State for Defence Ben Wallace unveiled the MAST-13 (since renamed Madfox), an autonomous unmanned surface vehicle that would be attached to a BAE Systems PAC24 rigid inflatable boat and protect surface ships.  was involved in the demonstration. On 24 June 2020, the Royal Navy announced that the first unmanned Pacific 24 boat has been launched. On 1 June 2021, the Madfox ASV successfully completed remote trials from range in the Solent, with personnel operating the vessel from the nearby coastline.

Other smaller non-combatant vessels 
On 9 August 2017, Defence Minister Harriett Baldwin announced the winner of Project Vahana, a £48 million contract for up to 38 (including HMS Magpie) modular glass-reinforced plastic hull workboats of between 11 and 18m long, which will support Royal Navy ships. Tasks to be carried out by the boats will include officer and diver training (8 & 7 boats respectively), hydrographic survey (3 boats), Antarctic exploration, explosive ordinance disposal and passenger transport (3 boats) for HMS Prince of Wales. In their role as passenger transport, the boats are capable of carrying up to 36 personnel to and from the aircraft carriers, especially where port facilities are too small to allow the carrier alongside, before being winched from the water using on-board lifting equipment and stowed inside. These boats will be built by Atlas Elektronik UK in Dorset and are scheduled to be in service by 2021. Unusually, these workboats are not scheduled to be used as passenger transfer boats with HMS Queen Elizabeth as this role was taken by a previously announced contract for 4 such boats with Alnmaritec.

On 15 December 2015, the Ministry of Defence awarded a £13.5m contract to BAE Systems for the production of 60 new Pacific 24 rigid-hulled inflatable boats for use with Royal Navy & Royal Fleet Auxiliary ships. The contract took 4 years to complete and began in early 2016. Babcock was awarded a maintenance contract at DSEI 2019 for ARCHER-class patrol and training vessels, rigid-inflatable boats (RIB), yachts, static training vessels, small cadet boats and police boats. BAE Systems was awarded the latest contract to support in-service PAC24s and a range of other small craft in service with the Royal Navy and other branches of the UK armed forces in 2019.

Royal Fleet Auxiliary Ships

The ships were originally expected to enter service in the mid-2020s. The 2017 National Shipbuilding Strategy confirm this, noting that the Fleet Solid Support ships would be subjected to an international competition and be delivered by the mid-2020s.

However, late in 2019 this competition was stopped in the face of criticism that the competition permitted the potential construction of the ships outside the UK. The competition was anticipated as likely to be restarted with revised terms of reference. On 21 October 2020, it was indicated that the competition for the FSS will be restarted in Spring 2021, covering three ships and it will be an international competition but the team must be a led by a British company. The 2021 defence white paper confirmed that three FSSS would be built. In May 2021 the competition to build the ships was relaunched with the aim of taking a decision within two years. In July 2022, Rear-Admiral Paul Marshall, the Senior Responsible Officer for the Fleet Solid Support ship project, told the House of Commons Select Defence Committee that the first ship was envisaged for service entry in 2028 with the third entering service by 2032. In November 2022 it was announced that Team Resolute (BMT, Harland & Wolff and Navantia) had been selected to build the ships with the start of construction anticipated in 2025. The manufacturing contract, with a value of 1.6 billion pounds, was signed in January 2023.

A parliamentary reply on 21 March 2016 noted that "The consideration of options to deliver the capabilities provided by RFA Diligence and RFA Argus remains ongoing". An August 2016 notice stated that Diligence was placed up for sale, and that the MOD was considering options for a replacement. The 2021 defence white paper was silent on a specific replacement for either vessel, essentially confirming that the enhanced aviation capabilities eventually envisaged as being provided by the mooted Multi-Role Support Ships (MRSS), would be the de facto replacement for Argus though the first MRSS might not actually enter service until the 2030s. In 2022, it was confirmed that Argus would in fact be extended in service "beyond 2030".

In addition to its existing capabilities, the Royal Fleet Auxiliary will also assume responsibility both for the new MROSS capability, with the vessel purchased for that purpose intended to be commissioned into the RFA as RFA Proteus, as well the ship intended to serve as the autonomous mine-hunting control vessel.

Submarines

Astute-class nuclear attack submarine

In 1997 the MOD signed a contract with GEC-Marconi (now BAE Systems Submarine Solutions) to deliver a new class of nuclear powered attack submarines to the Royal Navy. However delays led to the construction of only seven Astute-class, thereby replacing only the Trafalgar-class de facto. The first-in-class HMS Astute was laid down in January 2001 and commissioned into the fleet in August 2010, followed by her sisters HMS Ambush (2013), HMS Artful (2016), HMS Audacious (2020) and HMS Anson (2022). As of August 2022, five of the boats have been commissioned and two are under construction. The entry into service of the seventh boat is planned for 2026.

The Astute-class are much larger than their predecessors and have greatly improved stealth, endurance and weapons load. Each submarine is capable of carrying up to 38 Tomahawk Land Attack Cruise Missiles and Spearfish heavyweight torpedoes.

Dreadnought-class nuclear ballistic missile submarine

In July 2016 it was confirmed that a new class of submarine would be built to replace the current fleet of 4  ballistic missile submarines (SSBN) which carry the United Kingdom's nuclear deterrent. On 18 July 2016 the House of Commons voted 472 for and 117 against to proceed to build the new submarines. On 21 October 2016, the MoD announced that the first of the four planned boats would be named , with the name also attached to the class. Construction of Dreadnought had commenced by 2017. On 6 December 2018, the second boat of this class was named as HMS Valiant. The final two boats of the class have been named HM Submarines Warspite and King George VI.

SSN-AUKUS 

Prior to 2023, the plan for a Maritime Underwater Future Capability (MUFC), that is, a successor to the Astute-class SSN, was known the SSN (R) program. MUFC was also known as the 'Astute Replacement Nuclear Submarine (SSN (R))'. In September 2021, a £170 million contract was awarded to BAE Systems and Rolls-Royce for initial design work on the submarines. 

In 2023, an agreement was reached by the American, British and Australian Governments to jointly develop a new attack submarine that is to be an evolution from SSN (R). The program will be a joint British-Australian-American project and will involve the construction of a new class of submarine for both the Royal Navy and the Royal Australian Navy. According to the Joint Leaders Statement, "Beginning in 2023, Australian military and civilian personnel will embed with the U.S. Navy, the Royal Navy, and in the United States and United Kingdom submarine industrial bases to accelerate the training of Australian personnel. The United States plans to increase SSN port visits to Australia beginning in 2023, with Australian sailors joining U.S. crews for training and development; the United Kingdom will increase visits to Australia beginning in 2026. ... In the late 2030s, the United Kingdom will deliver its first SSN-AUKUS to the Royal Navy. Australia will deliver the first SSN-AUKUS built in Australia to the Royal Australian Navy in the early 2040s". The program is to benefit from American technology transfers that will support the construction of the AUKUS submarines. 

In November 2022, MSubs Ltd was awarded a £15.4m contract to build an XLUUV (Extra Large Uncrewed Underwater Vehicle) vessel which is to be delivered to the Royal Navy within two years. The 17-tonne vessel (known as Project CETUS) was described as being "the next step in developing autonomous underwater warfare capability" and is also to feed into the design of SSN(R)/SSN AUKUS.

Aircraft

Fixed-wing aircraft

The Invincible class, because of its small size, had only a limited capacity and was only capable of operating STOVL aircraft, the Harrier GR7/GR9. In 2006 the Sea Harrier was withdrawn from service. This saw the front line Sea Harrier squadron of the Fleet Air Arm converting to the Harrier GR9, as part of the evolution of the Joint Force Harrier concept. The Harrier's replacement in both the RAF and the FAA is the F-35 Lightning II Joint Combat Aircraft. The F-35 is a significant improvement over the Harrier, in terms of speed, range and weapon load.

The UK had plans to order 138 F-35Bs for the FAA and RAF. The financial crisis led to the decision taken in the 2010 SDSR to immediately withdraw the Harrier GR9 force in late 2010 along with HMS Ark Royal, to reduce the total number of F-35s planned for purchase by the UK, and to purchase the F-35C CATOBAR version rather than the STOVL F-35B. By May 2012, the government had decided to purchase the short-take off version, the F-35B instead.

In July 2012, the Secretary of State for Defence stated that an initial 48 F-35Bs will be purchased to equip the carrier fleet. In September 2013, it was announced that the second JSF squadron would be the Fleet Air Arm's 809 NAS. Chancellor George Osborne announced on 22 November 2015 that the UK will have 24 F-35Bs on its two new carriers by 2023. While the 2015 SDSR declared that the United Kingdom would buy 138 F-35s over the life of the programme, the 2021 defence white paper sharply reduced that total to "beyond 48". Subsequently, the First Sea Lord indicated that the new envisaged number was to be 60 aircraft initially and "then maybe more", up to a maximum of around 80 to hopefully equip four "deployable squadrons".

On 20 May 2016, it had been reported that the UK would field four frontline squadrons as part of its Lightning Force; in addition to 809 NAS, plus another Fleet Air Arm squadron, four Royal Air Force units (617 Sqn plus another operational squadron, 207 Sqn as the OCU, and 17(R) Squadron as the Operational Evaluation Unit) were also formed. The UK is committed to improving its F-35Bs to Block 4 standard. In 2016 it had been planned that 809 NAS would stand up in April 2023. However, by 2021 it was no longer clear that this objective would be met and a specific date for 809 NAS to stand up had yet to be confirmed. In early 2022, one analysis suggested that 809 Squadron might not stand up before 2026 and that a third frontline F-35 squadron might not be active before 2030. In September 2022, it was reported that 809 Squadron would in fact formally stand up in 2023 but that it would not be considered "deployable" for a further two years thereafter. In 2022, U.K. Defence Secretary Ben Wallace reported that the RAF and Royal Navy faced a considerable challenge in providing even the existing modest F-35B fleet with qualified pilots. As of late 2022 there were only 30 qualified British pilots (plus three exchange pilots from the United States and Australia) for the F-35. The average wait time for RAF trainee Typhoon and F-35 pilots, after completing the Military Flying Training System, was approximately 11 and 12 months respectively. A further gap of 68 weeks existed between completing Basic Flying Training and beginning Advanced Fast Jet Training. The resulting pilot shortage was a factor in being able to stand up the first Fleet Air Arm Squadron (809 Squadron) on a timely basis.

In April 2022, the Deputy Chief of Defence Staff, Air Marshal Richard Knighton, told the House of Commons Defence Select Committee that the MoD was in discussions to purchase a second tranche of 26 F-35B fighters. Plans for frontline F-35B squadrons had been modified and now envisaged a total of three squadrons (rather than four) each deploying 12-16 aircraft. In surge conditions 24 F-35s might be embarked on the carrier but a routine deployment would likely involve 12 aircraft.

Helicopters

The 2010 Strategic Defence and Security Review saw the Fleet Air Arm transition to operate two types of helicopter – the AW101 Merlin and the AW159 Wildcat. These replaced the aging fleet of Westland Sea Kings and Westland Lynxes. There are 30 Merlin HM.2 helicopters in service.

The future AEW capability of the FAA is the "Crowsnest" programme, is set to replace the Sea King ASaC.7 which retired in September 2018. The Thales Crowsnest radar is a slightly upgraded version of the existing Searchwater 2000 radar. As part of the process of the system reaching initial operating capability, Crowsnest was deployed with the Royal Navy's carrier task group in 2021. However, the system experienced operating challenges. Initial operating capability of the system is now expected in the second quarter of 2023 and full operating capability in 2024/25. It has been reported that initially five Merlins will be equipped with Crowsnest, three of these being normally assigned to the "high readiness" aircraft carrier.

The original six-year capability-gap between the retirement of the Sea King ASaC.7 fleet and the entry service of Crowsnest was the source of much criticism.   All 30 of the Royal Navy's HM.2 Merlins will be equipped to carry the Crowsnest system, though a maximum of 10 could be fitted with it at any one time. As of 2020, the out of service date for the HM.2s was envisaged as 2029 while the HC.4s were scheduled to retire by 2030. The 2021 defence white paper did not reference a Merlin replacement. However, it was subsequently indicated that the out of service date for both the HM.2s and the HC.4s had been extended to 2040.

Remote Piloted Air Systems

Following trials with the rail-launched ScanEagle it started operational flights of leased ScanEagles in January 2014 watching for swarm attacks on HMS Somerset and RFA Cardigan Bay in the Persian Gulf. This was expanded in November 2014, when 700X NAS was formed to serve as both the parent unit for ship based ScanEagle flights, and as the evaluation unit for any future RPAS systems that the Royal Navy elects to try. ScanEagle was withdrawn in 2017 and replaced by the RQ-20A Puma shoulder-launched UAV on board. The optionally-manned PZL-Świdnik SW-4 Solo completed trials with the RN in 2015 as part of the UK's RWUAS (Rotary Wing Unmanned Air System) Capability Concept Demonstrator (CCD) programme. In early 2023, the Schiebel S-100 Camcopter was selected to operate in an intelligence-gathering, surveillance and reconnaissance role with the Royal Navy. To be named Peregrine in Royal Navy service, it is initially intended to begin operations in the Persian Gulf in mid-2024.

The Royal Navy has also utilised 3-D printed unmanned aircraft in its operations.

The Royal Navy has planned for two future UAS: The Flexible Deployable UAS (FDUAS) and Joint Mini UAS (JMUAS) programs. FDUAS is seen as a "Sea Eagle (Scan Eagle) Plus" while JMUAS is a UAS for the Royal Marines. In November 2019, 700 NAS tested two new UAS, namely, the AeroVironment RQ-20 Puma and the AeroVironment Wasp III.

In 2020 NavyX tested a heavy quadcopter from Malloy Aeronautics, with the head engineer of Malloy stating that the aspiration was to autonomously deploy 180 kg payloads from a Royal Navy vessel over ranges of 20 km with their T400 quadcopter. Payloads could include people, torpedoes and fixed-wing drones. In 2022, a £60 million four-year contract was awarded to Leonardo to design and develop an uncrewed helicopter. A three-tonne demonstrator was envisaged to carry out trials for a UAV with anti-submarine capabilities.

In March 2021, Project Vixen was revealed to the public as a programme to examine the use of fixed-wing UAVs from the Queen Elizabeth-class aircraft carriers in roles such as strike and air-to-air refuelling. During the same month, it was also revealed that the MOD was seeking electromagnetic catapults and arrestor cables capable of launching large fixed-wing UAVs from the aircraft carriers within threefive years.

Royal Marines

The Royal Marines are being restructured for the future, with 200 driver and administrative staff posts set to be reallocated to Royal Navy personnel. 42 Commando was transformed into a specialised "Maritime Operations unit" so that roles from that unit such as heavy weapons specialists, can be reallocated across the Royal Navy as of May 2018 The Royal Marines stood up an office programme titled, Future Commando Force, aiming to give staff and intellectual horsepower to change the Royal Marines to meet the threats of the future. There will be two Littoral Response Groups: One based East of Suez, one based in the High North. On 27 June 2020, the Royal Marines announced the adopting of a new uniform with the MultiCam camouflage.

Weapons 

Sea Ceptor (formerly CAMM(M) or FLAADS) is a short-range air-defence missile to replace Sea Wolf on Type 23 frigates from 2016 and to be incrementally added to the armament of the Type 45 destroyers from 2026.
Sea Viper, used by the Type 45 destroyers, has undergone trials using its SAMPSON radar to track ballistic missiles, and work is ongoing to develop its Aster missiles to counter ballistic missiles. The UK is also considering upgrading its Type 45 Destroyers with the Aster 30 Block 1NT missile.
Martlet (formerly FASGW (Light) and the Lightweight Multirole Missile) is a short range, supersonic anti-ship missile for use against small surface warships, patrol vessels and craft. Martlet entered initial service in 2021 on the Fleet Air Arm's Wildcat maritime helicopters. Full operating capability is expected in 2024.
Sea Venom (formerly FASGW (Heavy)), a bigger anti-shipping missile launched from helicopters, replacing former Sea Skua missile which was withdrawn from service in 2017. Initially reported deployed with helicopters of the Royal Navy's carrier strike group in 2021. Full operating capability for Sea Venom expected in 2024.
The SPEAR 3 missile is a multi-role networked anti-ship and land-attack missile based on the Brimstone anti-tank missile with the JSOW-ER turbojet to extend the range to over 120 km. Four Spear 3 can fit in two internal weapons bay of an F-35B, MBDA are also looking at ship launch for members of the Brimstone family, including a quick-firing, anti-swarm 'Sea Spear'. In November 2021, Defence Procurement Minister Jeremy Quin suggested that full operating capability for SPEAR-3 on F-35 might occur in around 2028.
The FC/ASW (Future Cruise/Anti Ship Weapon) is a future anti-ship cruise missile planned for the Royal Navy and the French Navy. MBDA has presented Perseus, a supersonic multi-role cruise missile concept study which was unveiled at the Paris 2011 Air Show. In the 2016 UK-France Security Summit, the two parties pledged to work on a "joint concept phase for the Future Cruise/Anti-Ship Weapon (FC/ASW) programme to identify solutions for replacement of the Scalp/Storm Shadow missiles, for both countries, Harpoon for the UK and Exocet for France." In 2021, Jeremy Quin indicated that the plan was to equip the Type 26-class frigates with the missile from 2028. In October 2021 it was reported that the project had been put "on hold", at least temporarily, by France in response to the U.K. role in Australia's decision to cancel the acquisition of French-designed conventional submarines. Then in November the First Sea Lord, Admiral Tony Radakin, told the House of Commons Select Defence Committee that options for FC/ASW were still "being looked at" including potential hypersonic weapons. This might in fact delay the introduction of these weapons until the 2030s. 
A prior information notice (PIN) for contracts was announced on 5 March 2019 for a Next Generation Interim Surface Ship Guided Weapon (I-SSGW), that is, an anti-ship missile to replace the Royal Navy's Harpoon Block 1C missiles on five of the Type-23-class frigates. The possible candidates for the requirement were the Harpoon Block II+, LRASM, Naval Strike Missile, RBS15 Mk4, Exocet Block 3C, Gabriel V missile, C-star, Type 90 Ship-to-Ship Missile or Hsiung Feng III. A contract notice was issued on 22 August 2019 for an "Interim Surface to Surface Guided Weapon System (I-SSGW)", requesting for an over-the-horizon anti ship capability and a terrain-following precision land attack capability. The land attack requirement had been likely to disqualify the Harpoon, Exocet and C-Star from the competition. However, in November 2021 the First Sea Lord, Admiral Tony Radakin, told the House of Commons Select Defence Committee that the program "had been paused" and seemed likely to be cancelled. The project was confirmed to have been cancelled in February 2022. Even so, in July 2022 Defence Secretary Ben Wallace indicated that the project might be resurrected yet again. In November 2022, the Naval Strike Missile was purchased to be fitted to 11 Type 45 destroyers and Type 23 frigates. Initial delivery of the first systems was anticipated by the end of 2023.
 The British Government announced on 5 January 2017 that it had awarded a £30 million contract to UK consortium 'Dragonfire' to develop a directed energy weapon technology demonstrator. Their intention is to have a working prototype ready by the end of the decade and potentially have vessels equipped with directed energy weapons by the mid-2020s. In July 2022, the system began a series of trials to prove the accuracy and power of the weapon.
In July 2019, the UK issued a Prior Information Notice for Directed Energy Weapon (DEW) demonstrators. This differs from the above Dragonfire as it combines multiple laser beams to produce a weapon more powerful than its predecessors and resistant to the most challenging environmental conditions.

Navigation and communication 
In January 2016, it was announced that a £44m Navigation Radar Programme would see "more than 60 Royal Navy ships, submarines and shore facilities" fitted with state-of-the-art navigation radars, with contracts awarded to Lockheed Martin Integrated Systems UK and Kelvin Hughes.
The MoD is reportedly investing heavily in development of quantum compasses which could potentially transcend the need for GPS as a means of navigation, providing a self-contained and interference-proof alternative. Deployment of this technology is often discussed with regard to the Royal Navy's submarine fleet, allowing vessels to navigate without outside assistance and therefore remain submerged for extended lengths of time.
In December 2018, it was announced that a £23m agreement to provide Royal Navy and Royal Fleet Auxiliary ships with new radios had been signed. The radios will be installed on 39 ships in total, including 13 Type 23 Frigates, 4 survey and ice patrol vessels, 13 minehunters and 9 RFA supply ships and will be used to communicate with other ships, ports and aircraft during operations. They will replace numerous older radios and as more modern pieces of equipment, they are easier and can be updated via software and operated remotely. Under the contract, Thales will develop, fit and support a V/UHF radio solution which includes the acquisition of around 300 Rohde & Schwarz radios. The first radio will enter service on a Type 23 Frigate in 2020, with all radios due to be delivered and installed by the end of 2023.

Senior personnel changes 
The Sunday Times reported that First Sea Lord Admiral Tony Radakin announced a reduction in the number of Rear-Admirals at Navy Command by five. The fighting arms excluding Commandant General Royal Marines were reduced to 1-star or Commodore rank and the surface flotillas combined. Training is now concentrated under the Fleet Commander. From May 2020, the post of Flag Officer Sea Training was downgraded from a Rear-Admiral's to a Commodore's position and was retitled Commander Fleet Operational Sea Training.

See also

List of active Royal Navy ships
Future of the Royal Air Force
Army 2020 Refine

References

External links

Royal Navy
Military planning